"Can't Nobody" is a song recorded by South Korean girl group 2NE1. It was released as one of the three title tracks from the group's debut studio album To Anyone on September 9, 2010 by YG Entertainment. The song was written and produced by Teddy Park and is musically a dance-pop number with the lyrics revolving around the themes of self-confidence and empowerment. Commercially, it peaked at number 2 on both the weekly and monthly Gaon Digital Charts and sold more than 2.3 million digital units by the end of the year.

Background
The song was written and produced by Teddy Park, who has worked on 2NE1's previous extended play in 2009 and their single "Try to Follow Me" in February 2010. It was promoted as part of the triple “title tracks”, or lead promotional singles for the album To Anyone, along with "Clap Your Hands" and "Go Away". The music video for "Can't Nobody" was released on September 12, and the first live stage for the song was broadcast later that night on Inkigayo. The song would go on to win seven first place awards on several music programs, including their first two "Triple Crowns" on Inkigayo and M! Countdown. The song was promoted alongside "Go Away" and would last for a month and half before ceasing for "It Hurts (Slow)".

The English version of "Can't Nobody" was released on Recochoku, a popular Japanese ringtones website, on January 19, 2011. It also coincided with the release of the music video for the English version. On February 23, 2010, it was announced that it would be packaged with the Japanese version of "Go Away" as 2NE1's debut single in Japan.

Commercial performance
Following the album's release, the song debuted at number four on the Gaon Digital Chart and was the highest-charting song out of all the album's tracks. The following week, "Can't Nobody" rose two positions and peaked at number 2, just below the album's other title track "Go Away". By the end of 2010, the song was downloaded over 2,300,000 times, making it the 13th best-selling single of the year in South Korea.

Music video

Background

The music video was filmed in August 2010. Two different versions of the video were filmed: a Korean version and an English version—and were both directed by Seo Hyun-seung, who has also directed 2NE1's previous videos such as "Fire" and "Try to Follow Me". Filming for the music video lasted about 4 days for both the Korean and English versions. The original Korean video was uploaded to 2NE1's official YouTube channel on September 12, 2010 while the English version was uploaded on April 7, 2011.

Synopsis

The Korean music video begins with CL singing the intro under a curtain as she pulls the zipper down to reveal her nose and mouth. The scene changes with her wearing black attire, rising up in an elevator. As her verse begins, she is seen driving a black Lamborghini around the city of Seoul. As her verse continues, the video shows CL coming out of a pink van with "2NE1" labeled on the side. She continues to sing as Minzy, Dara and Bom are dancing behind her wearing pink space-like suits. In Minzy's verse, she dances provocatively along an isolated corridor. For the chorus, the scene shows all the members dancing as Bom and Dara sing the main vocals. In the second verse, the girls are wearing masks that resemble 1TYM's Teddy Park and G-Dragon. The next scene shows CL in a room with large stereo/robotic-type machines in the background as she performs in a yellow chair. In Minzy's verse, the scene moves back and forth from her wearing a studded hoodie and tattoos on her torso while sitting on a boombox, and her in a business suit standing next to a large black dog. The next scene shows Bom wearing a black karate suit sitting in a meditation room with her eyes closed, and another scene that shows her performing in front of lights. In Dara's scene, she's seen wearing a long and elegant gown as wind blows through the fabrics of the dress.  Afterwards, the girls are all seen in a spaceship as it begins to malfunction.  The space craft overturns, and the girls then go down a slide. The last scene shows the girls dancing and having fun in a large white room with flashing lights. The video concludes with Dara head-butting the camera and the girls looking through it.

Accolades

Credits and personnel
 2NE1 — primary vocals
 Songwriter — Teddy Park
 Composer — Teddy
 Arranger — Teddy

Charts and certifications

Charts

Monthly charts

Yearly charts

Release history

References

External links
 
 

2010 singles
2NE1 songs
Korean-language songs
YG Entertainment singles
Songs written by Teddy Park
2010 songs